Gyroweisia is a genus of mosses belonging to the family Pottiaceae.

The genus was first described by Wilhelm Philippe Schimper.

The genus has cosmopolitan distribution.

The genus contains seven species:

Gyroweisia barbulacea 
Gyroweisia monterreia 
Gyroweisia reflexa 
Gyroweisia rohlfsiana 
Gyroweisia shansiensis 
Gyroweisia tenuis 
Gyroweisia yuennanensis

References

Pottiaceae
Moss genera